Ha Yaek Lat Phrao station (formerly known as Ladphrao Intersection station) is a BTS Skytrain station on the Sukhumvit Line in Bangkok, Thailand. The station was renamed due to fears of miscommunication.

It was the northern terminus of the line until 4 December 2019, which was when the Kasetsart University station opened. It connects to the MRT Blue Line. It is one of only four operational BTS stations to have island platforms, the others being Siam, Samrong, and Wat Phra Sri Mahathat.

References

See also
 Bangkok Skytrain

BTS Skytrain stations
Railway stations opened in 2019